This is a list of flags inscribed with Spanish-language text.

See also
List of inscribed flags

Notes

Spanish language
Flags